The Pine Creek Subdivision is a railroad line owned by CSX Transportation in the U.S. state of West Virginia. It was formerly part of the CSX Huntington East Division. It became part of the CSX Florence Division on June 20, 2016. At its east end it branches off of the Logan and Southern Subdivision and at its west end the line comes to an end.

See also
 List of CSX Transportation lines

References

CSX Transportation lines
Rail infrastructure in West Virginia